Edgar Richard "Ernie" Mayne (2 July 1882 – 26 October 1961) was an Australian cricketer who played as a right-handed batsman and bowler.

Mayne played in four Test matches for Australia between 1912 and 1921. He made his Test debut on 15 July 1912 against South Africa in the 1912 Triangular Tournament in England. His final two Tests came on the Australian tour to South Africa in 1921/22, with his last test appearance at Newlands Cricket Ground.

References

External links

1882 births
1961 deaths
Australia Test cricketers
South Australia cricketers
Victoria cricketers
Australian cricketers
Cricketers from South Australia